The Acorn may refer to:

 The Acorn (band), a Canadian folk band
 The Acorn (journal), a philosophy journal

See also
 Acorn (disambiguation)